Louisa Hodge  is an Emmy-winning weather anchor and general assignment reporter for KCBS-2/KCAL-9 at CBS Studio Center in Studio City, California.  Previously she spent two years working as a meteorologist/anchor/reporter for Independent TV KRON-4 in San Francisco and prior to KRON she was a TV anchor and reporter for Tribune Fox affiliate KTXL in Sacramento, CA. She was a weeknight reporter and weekend weather anchor for Fox 40 News at 10 with Teri Cox and Joe Orlando. Prior to her arrival at KTXL in November 2005, she was a co-host for "Wake Up!" on KNVN and KHSL-TV in Chico, CA as well as a Field reporter and weather reporter for NCN for a period of time since former anchor Maureen Naylor left NCN for ABC O&O KFSN in Fresno, CA. Prior to KNVN/KHSL, Louisa worked at WPTV in West Palm Beach, FL as a photographer and worked as an intern at Good Morning America.

Louisa is a Communications graduate from University of Vermont.

Louisa currently resides in Santa Monica, Los Angeles area, California and enjoys traveling, snowboarding and exploring many outdooristic adventurisms.

References

Living people
Television anchors from San Francisco
University of Vermont alumni
Year of birth missing (living people)
Television anchors from Sacramento, California
Television anchors from Los Angeles